Irene Laskarina (died 1240) (Eirēnē Laskarina) was an Empress of Nicaea. She was a daughter of Theodore I Laskaris, emperor of Nicaea and Anna Angelina. Her maternal grandparents were Emperor Alexios III Angelos and Euphrosyne Doukaina Kamaterina. Her sister Maria Laskarina married King Béla IV of Hungary.

Irene first married the general Andronikos Palaiologos, and after his death became the wife of Theodore's designated successor, the future John III Doukas Vatatzes in 1212.  With John III she had a son, the future Theodore II Laskaris. After the latter's birth, she fell from a horse and was so badly injured that she was unable to have any more children. She retired to a convent, taking the monastic name Eugenia, and died there in summer of 1240, some fourteen years before her husband.

Irene is much praised by historians for her modesty and prudence and is said to have brought about by her example a considerable improvement in the morals of her nation.

Notes

1240 deaths
Irene
13th-century Byzantine nuns
Empresses of Nicaea
Year of birth unknown
Daughters of Byzantine emperors
Mothers of Byzantine emperors